Cajabamba District is one of the four districts of the province Cajabamba in Peru.

See also 
 Q'inququcha

References